‘Īsá ibn Fulaytah al-Ḥasanī al-‘Alawī (d. ) was Emir of Mecca from 1161 to 1175. He belonged to the sharifian dynasty known as the Hawashim. He was preceded by his nephew Qasim ibn Hashim, and succeeded by his son Da'ud. He died on 2 Sha'ban 570 AH.

Sources 

Year of birth unknown
1175 deaths
12th-century Arabs
History of Mecca
History of Saudi Arabia
Sharifs of Mecca